Ausava is a genus of moths of the family Noctuidae.  It is now considered a synonym of Lithacodia.

References
Natural History Museum Lepidoptera genus database

Eustrotiinae